Joseph Anthonius John van den Brom (born 4 October 1966) is a Dutch former professional footballer and the current manager of Ekstraklasa side Lech Poznań. As a player, he played for Vitesse, Ajax, De Graafschap and Istanbulspor. After his playing career, Van den Brom became a manager. He worked as a head coach for AGOVV Apeldoorn (2007–2010), ADO Den Haag (2010–2011), Vitesse (2011–2012) and Anderlecht (2012–2014). After managing AZ for five years, he moved to take charge of FC Utrecht from the 2019–20 season.

Playing career

Club career
Born in Amersfoort, Netherlands, Van den Brom started his career at the amateurs of APWC in Amersfoort before signing as a professional footballer for Vitesse in 1986. After seven seasons with Vitesse, playing 225 games and scoring 80 goals, he made the move to Dutch giants Ajax, where he played for two seasons before moving abroad with Turkish side Istanbulspor. He returned to Vitesse after one season, and spent another five seasons there before signing for De Graafschap for his final season, retiring from playing in 2003.

International career
Van den Brom made two appearances for the Dutch national team. He played in the 8–0 win against Malta and the 6–0 win against San Marino. He scored one goal.

Managerial career
After his playing career he became head scout of De Graafschap and head coach of amateur side Bennekom, before becoming coach of the second team at Ajax, on 29 April 2004. From 2007 to 2010 he served as head coach of small Eerste Divisie club AGOVV Apeldoorn with impressive results, also winning a place in the promotion playoffs in his last season in charge. In May 2010 he was presented as new head coach of Eredivisie club ADO Den Haag, with whom he qualified for the 2011–12 Europa League. In June 2011, Van den Brom was named as head coach of his old club Vitesse. Again, he managed to qualify for the Europa League.

He signed with Belgian side Anderlecht on 29 May 2012 as head coach. He was sacked on 10 March 2014.

On 27 September 2014, it was announced that Van den Brom had signed a deal with AZ to succeed Marco van Basten as the new manager. After managing AZ for five years, he moved to take charge of FC Utrecht from the 2019–20 season.

In November 2020 van den Brom was announced as the new manager of Belgian First Division A side Genk following Jess Thorup's departure. He was sacked by Genk on 6 December 2021.

On 31 March 2022, van den Brom was announced as the manager of Saudi Professional League club Al-Taawoun.

On 19 June 2022, he was announced as the manager of defending Polish Ekstraklasa champions Lech Poznań, replacing Maciej Skorża who left the team due to personal reasons.

Career statistics

Managerial statistics

Honours

As player
Vitesse
Eerste Divisie: 1988–89

Ajax
Eredivisie: 1993–94, 1994–95
Dutch Supercup: 1993, 1994
UEFA Champions League: 1994–95

As manager
Anderlecht
Belgian Pro League: 2012–13
Belgian Super Cup: 2012, 2013

Genk
Belgian Cup: 2020–21

References

External links
 

1966 births
Living people
Sportspeople from Amersfoort
Association football midfielders
Dutch footballers
Dutch football managers
Dutch expatriate football managers
Netherlands international footballers
SBV Vitesse players
AFC Ajax players
İstanbulspor footballers
De Graafschap players
Eredivisie players
Eerste Divisie players
Süper Lig players
Dutch expatriate footballers
Expatriate footballers in Turkey
Dutch expatriate sportspeople in Turkey
AFC Ajax non-playing staff
Jong Ajax managers
AGOVV Apeldoorn managers
ADO Den Haag managers
SBV Vitesse managers
Van Den Brom, John
AZ Alkmaar managers
Al-Taawoun FC managers
Lech Poznań managers
Eerste Divisie managers
Eredivisie managers
Belgian Pro League managers
Saudi Professional League managers
Ekstraklasa managers
Dutch expatriate sportspeople in Belgium
Expatriate football managers in Belgium
Dutch expatriate sportspeople in Saudi Arabia
Expatriate football managers in Saudi Arabia
Dutch expatriate sportspeople in Poland
Expatriate football managers in Poland
Footballers from Utrecht (province)